Leptadrillia is a genus of sea snails, marine gastropod mollusks in the family Drilliidae.

Description
The species in Leptadrillia have a dorsal varix.

Species
Species within the genus Leptadrillia include:
 Leptadrillia campechensis Fallon, 2016
 Leptadrillia cinereopellis Kuroda, Habe & Oyama, 1971
 Leptadrillia elissa (Dall, 1919)
 Leptadrillia firmichorda McLean & Poorman, 1971
 Leptadrillia flavomaculata Fallon, 2016
 Leptadrillia guianensis Fallon, 2016
 Leptadrillia histriata Fallon, 2016
 Leptadrillia incarnata Fallon, 2016
 Leptadrillia lizae Fallon, 2016
 Leptadrillia loria Bartsch, 1934
 Leptadrillia lucaya Fallon, 2016
 Leptadrillia luciae Fallon, 2016
 Leptadrillia maryae Fallon, 2016
 Leptadrillia moorei Fallon, 2016
  † Leptadrillia parkeri (Gabb, 1873)
 Leptadrillia profunda Fallon, 2016
 Leptadrillia quisqualis (Hinds, 1843)
 Leptadrillia splendida Bartsch, 1934
 Leptadrillia violacea Fallon, 2016
 Species brought into synonymy
 Leptadrillia albicoma (Dall, 1889): synonym of Neodrillia albicoma (Dall, 1889)
 Leptadrillia aomoriensis Nomura & Hatai, 1940: synonym of Splendrillia aomoriensis (Nomura & Hatai, 1940)
 Leptadrillia cookei (E. A. Smith, 1888): synonym of Syntomodrillia cookei (E. A. Smith, 1888)

References

 W. P. Woodring. 1928. Miocene Molluscs from Bowden, Jamaica. Part 2: Gastropods and discussion of results. Contributions to the Geology and Palaeontology of the West Indies

External links
  Fallon P.J. (2016). Taxonomic review of tropical western Atlantic shallow water Drilliidae (Mollusca: Gastropoda: Conoidea) including descriptions of 100 new species. Zootaxa. 4090(1): 1-363